jack green (the name was spelled with lower-case letters) is the pseudonym of Christopher Carlisle Reid (born 1928), an American literary critic who was a great defender of the work of William Gaddis. Reid—who took the name from a racing form after he quit his job to become a freelance  critic—particularly admired Gaddis' 1955 novel The Recognitions, which flopped upon being published. Reid believed that the commercial failure of the hardcover edition of Gaddis' novel was the result of it having been panned by literary critics. Reid's faith in Gaddis was borne out when The Recognitions  was chosen as one of TIME magazine's 100 best novels from 1923 to 2005.

(According to literary sleuth Don Foster, an English professor at Vassar College, jack green's name actually is John Carlisle. Carlisle was the son of novelist Helen Grace Carlisle and worked as an actuarial clerk at Metropolitan Life Insurance until 1957, when he quit his job.)

As jack green, Reid started a self-published fanzine called newspaper dedicated to the work of Gaddis. In the first edition of the 'zine, green claimed that The Recognitions was the greatest book of all time.  After meeting Gaddis, green wrote an article called Fire the bastards! for newspaper #12 that fiercely denounced the literary critics, who he believes doomed the novel with their bad reviews. In 1962, he also took out a full-page ad in The Village Voice heralding the paperback edition of The Recognitions (in which he again took a swipe at the critics).

Many in the literary scene mistakenly thought "jack green" was a pseudonym for Gaddis himself, while others believed that Gaddis paid for Green's ad.

In 1992, Dalkey Archive Press published Fire the Bastards! in book form, without green's knowledge or permission (because it was in the Public Domain), with an introduction by Gaddis scholar Steven Moore. Dalkey reissued it in paperback in 2012.

He was tangentially involved in the Wanda Tinasky letters imbroglio when one of the letters claimed that Gaddis and Thomas Pynchon were one and the same person. The Tinasky letters had been believed to be the work of Pynchon, but later were shown to be the work of poet Tom Hawkins by Dr. Don Foster, the Vassar English professor who unmasked Joe Klein as the author of Primary Colors.

In 1963, Hawkins self-published a paperback book that sold for $1 entitled Eve, the Common Muse of Henry Miller & Lawrence Durrell, that also addressed Gaddis and green. Hawkins insisted that Gaddis and green were the same person. In the Wanda Tinasky letters published in the 1980s, Hawkins continued to insist that Gaddis and green were one and the same, and also claimed that Gaddis/green had written the works of Pynchon. In 1986, Hawkins as Tinasky again claimed that jack green "...did pretty well in the auctorial line with novels published commercially under the names of William Gaddis and Thomas Pynchon." Foster proved that Hawkins, who was already dead, was Wanda Tinasky via textual analysis.

References

External links

Fire the Bastards! (complete text)
Review of Fire the bastards at The Complete Review
jack green's article "Peyote", reprinted from newspaper #8
"Who’s Writing Whose Writing? Gaddis, Green, Pynchon, and Tinasky" by Alan Westrope

1928 births
Living people
American literary critics
Place of birth missing (living people)
Vassar College faculty
20th-century American male writers
20th-century American non-fiction writers
American male non-fiction writers